Angelo Parra is an American playwright. He was born in Manhattan and grew up in the Bronx, New York City.  After graduating from Fordham University, his career included work as a reporter/photographer, public relations professional, politician, free-lance writer, and PR and journalism teacher at New York University before turning to theatre in 1986.  His first produced play, Casino, was presented at T. Schreiber Studio, and won a 1989 New York Foundation for the Arts (NYFA) Fellowship in Playwriting and an Arts International grant (sponsored by the National Endowment for the Arts, U.S. Information Agency, Rockefeller Foundation, and The Pew Charitable Trusts).

His work, The Devil's Music: The Life and Blues of Bessie Smith, with music on the life of Bessie Smith, was named "one of the top-10 Off-Broadway experiences of 2001" by the New York Daily News, "Best Solo Show" by Florida's Broward/Palm Beach New Times, won a second NYFA Playwriting Fellowship (2000), and was nominated for a Helen Hayes Award, Best Visiting Production (2018), and by the Lucille Lortel Awards for Best Solo Show in 2012.  The show, conceived by and originally directed by Joe Brancato and originally staged by Penguin Rep Theatre, Stony Point, NY, was invited to give six performances during the 2012 Montreal International Jazz Festival, making The Devil's Music the first play ever presented in the music festival's 30-year history!

Parra has production credits  in New York, Los Angeles, Chicago, Washington, D.C.; at Florida Stage (Palm Beach), The Hartford Stage (Hartford, Connecticut), Theatre Memphis, at the Cape Playhouse (Cape Cod); George Street Playhouse, Florida Rep, Royal Manitoba Theatre Center, Milwaukee Rep, Cleveland Play House, and, at the Edinburgh International Festival.  Parra also is the author of Playwriting for Dummies, part of the popular international series of how-to books.

Among Parra's other plays is the hospital drama, "Journey of the Heart", winner of the Jewel Box Theatre, Mixed Blood Theatre, and David James Ellis national play awards in 1998–99.  Also in 1998, Song of the Coquí, his Hispanic family drama with humor and dance, won the Chicano/Latino Literary Award (University of California, Irvine) and an "American Dream" prize by Repertorio Español in New York City.  His screenplay adaptation of Journey of the Heart was a Sundance Institute Feature Film Program Finalist (2002).

Working with editor Jeffrey B. Fuerst at Benchmark Education publishing, Parra has authored a dozen plays, essays, and historical books for grades K-12.  Parra also provides play script consultation at playscriptcoach.

Mr. Parra studied his craft at:  Roundabout Theatre Conservatory's Professional Playwright's Unit; New Dramatists Playwrights' Forum; a playwright’s workshop at Playwrights Horizons (with Albert Innaurato); and, the Playwrights Lab at T. Schreiber Studio, and earned his MFA in playwriting under Jack Gelber at Brooklyn College.

Parra is the winner of a National Endowment for the Humanities Landmarks of American History and Culture Grant (2008), is a member of the Dramatists Guild and member emeritus of the BMI Lehman Engel Musical Theater Workshop.  He was a Tennessee Williams Scholar at the 2000 Sewanee Writers Conference, teaches playwriting, performing arts, and English at SUNY Rockland Community College.

In addition to his BA in Communication Arts at Fordham, he earned an MA in Political Science at the New School in New York, and MFA in Playwriting at Brooklyn College.  He also is a graduate of the Hollywood Film Institute Independent Filmmaker Course.  Parra is currently a Penguin Rep Theatre Board Trustee and founder/moderator of the Main Street Playwright's Lab (Tarrytown, N.Y.).

Along with the children's musical Percy T. Penguin Comes to America, Parra's other plays include:
The Mnemonist
Canvases
The Price of Honor
Brooklyn Brownstone
Beau Geste - adaptation
Of Human Bondage - adaptation
Borinquen
Newley Discovered
Eva's Song - musical

References

Living people
American dramatists and playwrights
Year of birth missing (living people)
Brooklyn College alumni